Bismarck most often refers to:

 Otto von Bismarck (1815–1898), Prussian statesman and first Chancellor of Germany
 Bismarck, North Dakota, the capital of North Dakota, U.S.
 German battleship Bismarck, a 1939 German World War II battleship

Bismarck or Bismark may also refer to:

Places

United States
 Bismarck, Arkansas
 Bismarck, Illinois
 Bismarck Township, Michigan
 Bismarck Township, Sibley County, Minnesota
 Bismarck, Missouri
 Bismarck, Nebraska
 Bismarck, North Dakota
 Bismarck, West Virginia
 Bismark, Oklahoma, former name of present Wright City, Oklahoma; name changed during World War I

Oceania
 Bismarck Sea, north of New Guinea
 Bismarck Archipelago, a part of Papua New Guinea
 Bismarck Range, a mountain range in Papua New Guinea
 Collinsvale, Tasmania, originally named Bismarck, in Australia

Other places
 Cape Bismarck, NE Greenland
 Bismarck, Chihuahua, a village in Mexico
 Bismark, Germany, the town after which Otto von Bismarck's ancestors were named
 Bismark, Limpopo, a town in South Africa

Other ships
 SMS Bismarck, a German  decommissioned in 1891
 SS Bismarck, a German ocean liner, launched in 1914, later renamed RMS Majestic
 USNS City of Bismarck (T-EPF-9), a 2017 United States high speed troop transport

Film and television
 Bismarck (1914 film), a 1914 German silent historical film
 Bismarck (1925 film), a 1925 German silent historical film
 Bismarck (1940 film), a 1940 film by Wolfgang Liebeneiner
 Sink the Bismarck!, a 1960 British film about the chase and sinking of the Bismarck.
 Bismark (anime), a 1984 Japanese anime series created by Studio Pierrot

Food
 Berliner (doughnut) or Bismarck
 Dutch baby pancake or Bismarck
 Black Velvet (beer cocktail) or Bismarck, a beer mix
 Bismarck herring

Other uses
 House of Bismarck, a German noble family descending from Herebord von Bismarck
 Bismarck (board game), a game from Avalon Hill about the hunt for the battleship Bismarck
 Bismarck (video game), a 1987 turn-based strategy video game
 Bismarck (apple), an apple cultivar
 "Bismarck", a 2019 song by Sabaton

People
 Bismarck (surname)
 Bismarck (given name)

See also
 Battle of Route Bismarck
 Battle of the Bismarck Sea
 Bismarck herring or pickled herring
 Bismarck Sapphire Necklace
 Bismarck tower
 Bismark Township, Nebraska (disambiguation)
 Fürst Bismarck, a list of ships
 Jan Eskymo Welzl or Arctic Bismarck (1868–1948), Czech traveller and adventurer
 USS Bismarck Sea (CVE-95)